Mads Christian Lyhne (born 9 February 2000), better known as Mads Christian, is a Danish singer who competed in the ninth season of the Danish series of The X Factor. Only 15 years old entering the contest, he was eliminated in live show 4 coming in 6th place. Mads Christian released his first single 'Crash Landing' in June 2016, and 'Clothes', 'Gucci Shoes' and 'Just give me time' in early 2017 during his collab with Warner Music. Mads Christian was signed by Mermaid Records in March 2018, where he took on a project to release an album in Danish. The album 'Naiv' (8 songs) was released in Februar 2019, yet prior to this the singles 'Du Ringer Bare', 'Engangsting', 'Hva' ska' vi nå?' and 'Romeo & Julie' from the album were released starting May 2018. All aforementioned were well received and remained for long periods on the Danish ChartsSource?. All 8 songs on the album 'Naiv' was written and co-composed by Mads Christian. Mads Christian is presently signed by Capitol Records, Universal Music Denmark and pursues a release rate of 5 new songs per year, as well as touring nationally both solo and with his band.

Performances during X Factor

Discography

Albums
 Overtænker (2021) – No. 34 Denmark

Singles

References

External links 

Living people
Singers from Copenhagen
X Factor (Danish TV series) contestants
21st-century Danish  male singers
2000 births